"Escape from LA" is a song by Canadian singer The Weeknd from his fourth studio album After Hours. It was released on March 20, 2020, alongside the rest of its parent album as the sixth track. The Weeknd co-wrote and produced the song along with Carlo Montagnese and Leland Tyler Wayne, with Mike McTaggart also credited as songwriter.

Critical reception
Billboard ranked "Escape from LA" as the worst song from the After Hours album: "The repetitiveness of the bridge, albeit descriptive, doesn’t do much to heighten the track’s lethargy."

Charts

Personnel
 The Weeknd – vocals, songwriting, production, keyboards, programming
 Illangelo – songwriting, keyboards, programming, engineering, mixing
 Metro Boomin – songwriting, keyboards, programming
 Mike McTaggart – songwriting, guitar
 Shin Kamiyama – engineering
 Dave Kutch – mastering
 Kevin Peterson – mastering

Release history

References

2020 songs
The Weeknd songs
Songs written by the Weeknd
Songs written by Illangelo
Songs written by Metro Boomin